A paper snowflake is a type of paper craft based on a snowflake that combines origami with papercutting. The designs can vary significantly after doing mandatory folding.

An online version of the craft is known as "Make-A-Flake", and was created by Barkley Inc. in 2008.

See also
 Kirigami

References

External links
 How to Make 6-Pointed Paper Snowflakes on Instructables

Paper folding
Paper art